F33 may refer to :
 HMS Somali (F33), a 1937 British Royal Navy Tribal-class destroyer
 Recurrent depressive disorder ICD-10 code
 Hirth F-33, an aircraft engine
 F-33, Another name for the KF-21.